Swarnamukhi is a 1998 Tamil-language drama film directed by K. S. Adhiyaman. The film stars Prakash Raj, Devayani and Parthiban, while Jai Ganesh, Manivannan, and Fathima Babu play supporting roles. It was released on 20 February 1998. The film was remade in Telugu with the same name.

Plot
Vanaja (Fathima Babu) is full of gratitude when Varadarajan (Manivannan), a scheming politician, generously helps her daughter Swarnamukhi (Devayani), perform her arangetram in a local temple, but she does not know the man whom she is being grateful to and is forced to become his mistress to safeguard her daughter's future. Akash (Prakash Raj), a Voltas representative, falls in love with Swarnamukhi and proposes marriage. She tries to keep him at arm's length by revealing her love affair with Pandian (Parthiban), who had left her at the altar. When Akash is still willing, they decide to get married, but then Pandian turns up. In the end, however, Swarnamukhi is triumphant.

Cast
Prakash Raj as Akash
Devayani as Swarnamukhi
Parthiban as Pandian
Jai Ganesh as Pandian's father
Manivannan as Varadarajan
Fathima Babu as Vanaja
Manobala as a translator
Supriya Palekar as Commissioner's daughter (guest appearance)

Production
When the film was still under production, Adhiyaman published the story as a serial in the magazine Ananda Vikatan.

Soundtrack

The film score and the soundtrack were composed by Swararaj. The soundtrack, released in 1998, features 7 tracks with lyrics written by director Agathiyan, Arivumathi, Thenmozhiyan and K. S. Adhiyaman.

References

External links

1998 films
1990s Tamil-language films
Indian drama films
Tamil films remade in other languages
Films directed by K. S. Adhiyaman
1998 drama films